is an embankment dam on the Isawa River in Iwate Prefecture, Japan. It was constructed between 1983 and 2013. Its reservoir, which submerged the smaller Ishibuchi Dam upstream, was full in May 2013. The dam's 15.7 MW power station was expected to be operational in July 2014.

References

Dams in Iwate Prefecture
Rock-filled dams
Dams completed in 2013
Hydroelectric power stations in Japan